is the fifth studio album by Japanese band Mucc, released on November 23, 2005. The album shows the band exploring new territory with less heavy material, drawing from folk influences. The lyrical themes of the album are also a sharp turn away from the darkness of their previous albums. The limited edition of the album includes a DVD with footage from their European tour. The first press versions included a second disc with two extra songs and had a blue cover instead of brown. The album reached number 22 on the Oricon chart.

Track listing

Note
 A re-recording of "Ame no Orchestra" was featured on their 2017 self-cover album Koroshi no Shirabe II This is NOT Greatest Hits.
 A re-recording of "Mukashi Kodomo Datta Hitotachi e" was featured on their 2021 best album Myojo.

Covers 
"Saishū Ressha" was covered by The Back Horn respectively, on the 2017 Mucc tribute album Tribute Of Mucc -en-.

References 

Mucc albums
2005 albums